Nicholas David Buchanan (born 3 April 1991) is an Australian cricketer. He made his Twenty20 (T20) debut for Brisbane Heat in the 2011–12 Big Bash League season on 16 December 2011. In August 2017, he was named in the 2017/18 squad for Tasmania, making his List A debut on 10 October 2017 against South Australia.

References

External links
 

1991 births
Living people
Australian cricketers
Brisbane Heat cricketers
Tasmania cricketers
Place of birth missing (living people)